Powderhall railway station served the area of Powderhall, Edinburgh, Scotland from 1895 to 1917 on the Edinburgh, Leith and Granton Line of the North British Railway.

History 
The station opened on 22 April 1895 by the North British Railway. It had a ticket office and waiting rooms on both platforms but it had no goods yard. It closed on 1 January 1917.

References

External links 

Disused railway stations in Edinburgh
Former Caledonian Railway stations
Railway stations in Great Britain opened in 1895
Railway stations in Great Britain closed in 1917
1895 establishments in Scotland
1917 disestablishments in Scotland